4 Angies is a 2006 Thai computer-animated comedy cartoon series produced by Anya Animation and released by Channel 3 HD and Homerun Entertainment. Four Angies, loosely based on the tv show of the name by Women to women. There are 4 women in different characters, the story of cartoon, four naughty girls is the three-dimensional animation about 4 Thai naughty girls in school (respectively voiced by Pui, Kai, Nina and Kalamare)

And for a while, Four Angies aired on Canal J, a top-rated France kids tv show. After France has the copyright, "Four Angies, four naughty girls" changed to "KaNiKaZo, Super Angies".

Plot 
separate into the season as follows

Season 1 
Main characters meet at elementary school. They were late, so became punished by the headmaster. In the end, four girls are classmate and then they were friend.

Season 2 
An evil villain disguises himself as a teacher at the elementary school, wants to destroy the world. Another teacher is a wizard trying to stop this, so he recruits the Four Angies to help because his power has been damaged.

Season 3: The Wonders of the 7 Notes 
The Four Angies are trying to search for a snowman. Additionally, there were seven notes that went missing in their music box, which must be found in order to stop the villain.

Special season: Explore the wonderful world 
Only lists when this special season was aired, in November 19, 2010, on channel 3 Thailand. Additionally, the air time was 6:00-6:30 p.m.

Cast

Main 
 Pui: one of the Four Angies, and is named after the host of the program “Pimonwan Hunthongkham”. The animated character has a stingy personality and likes to hoard things in her pocket. She carries around storage bags called "magic bag" which is ready to use for any situation. And also everyone refers she as "The Auntie" because she often slow and mature.
 Kai-Chan: one of the Four Angies and is named after another program host “Mee Suk Chaengmee Suk”. Kai-Chan’s personality is neat and very sweet. This character is afraid of teddy bears in season 1. She had mind control called "a heart-melting wink-wink eyes" magical power, where if people stare at her they will be put under a trance and agree with her.
 Nina one of the Four Angies and is named after a host of the program “Kunndadda Patchimsawat”. The animated character has a personality that is very neat and holds high responsibility. Because of her responsibility, she easily gains the trust of teachers. However, one flaw she had is that she cannot control her dancing whenever she hears music which is "Nina Dance Tornado" magical power.
 Kalamare one of the Four Angies and is named after one of the hosts “Patcharasri Benchamas”. The personality of Kalamare is harsh and straightforward. She likes to use force and talk very loudly so she has a  "surround voice" magical power. She is confident to do morally right things and love her friends.

Supporting characters 
 Captain J: the last man in the Mars that survive from the Wizard Doo Hoo's destruction. After his home was destroyed, he has come to the earth and become a teacher at Angel Primary School under the name "Teacher Jae" to wait for Wizard Doo Hoo and be a superhero for protecting the world.
 X-4: a member of "X-Tra Ordinary 4", a boy group that has 4 members and they are the same age as Four Angies. X-4 is the rival of Four Angies. They like to bully and make trouble.
 Wizard Doo Hoo:  an alien that wants to destroy the world but he is intercepted by Captain J and caused his staff fallen into Pui's hands.
 The headmaster: a very strict teacher and also he was a toy-loving person but he did not want anyone to know his behavior. Therefore, he make a rules not allow students to bring toys to school because he will not able to control himself to play the toys.
 Teacher Tim: a kind teacher and is also the homeroom teacher of Four Angies.
 Grandma: the shop owner at "Grandma's shop", everything that customers want are in the shop.
 Little Ice: s a child that like to eat ice cream. He is always holding ice cream all the time and he was often bullied by the X-4.

Release 
This animation was released on channel 3 in Thailand since 2006 and Canal J in France

References

2006 Thai television series debuts
2011 Thai television series endings
Thai animated television series